Smell of Camphor, Fragrance of Jasmine, or Booye Kafoor, Atre Yas, is an Iranian film written by, directed by and starring Bahman Farmanara. It was his first contribution to Iranian cinema in two decades.

Plot
The protagonist, a film director named Bahman Farjami, is coming to terms with aging. He grieves for his wife, lost five years prior. He seeks to make a documentary about death, dying and the grieving process, or so he tells his friends.

Quotes

 When a filmmaker doesn't make films, that is death." -- Bahman

External links
About the movie

http://www.filmreleases.com/rel2001.htm

2000 films
Iranian drama films
2000 drama films
2000s Persian-language films
Films whose director won the Best Directing Crystal Simorgh
Crystal Simorgh for Best Film winners